Orren Stephenson (born 15 July 1982) is an Australian rules footballer who played for the Geelong Football Club and the Richmond Football Club in the Australian Football League (AFL).

He was originally drafted by the Geelong Football Club in the 2011 AFL Draft at the age of 29, the oldest first-time draftee in AFL draft history.

Early life
Stephenson grew up in the southern New South Wales towns of Albury, Wagga Wagga and Griffith.  He mainly played rugby league as a junior, before he met his wife Whitney. It was at the Mangoplah Cookardinia United Eastlakes football club where Stephenson first got his taste of senior Australian rules football. In 2002 Stephenson moved his young family to Ballarat in central Victoria where his wife Whitney's family lives.  He started playing football for the Redan Football Club and after 2 premiership wins in 2002 and 2003 and then winning their best and fairest award in 2004, Stephenson joined the North Ballarat Football Club in 2005.

VFL career
Stephenson has been a member of four VFL premiership teams: three with North Ballarat in 2008, 2009 and 2010, and one with Geelong in 2012; he won the Norm Goss Medal as the best player on the ground in the 2009 Grand Final.  He was named in four VFL teams of the year and represented the VFL twice in interstate matches.

AFL career
Stephenson was selected by Geelong in the 2011 AFL national draft, to replace the retiring Brad Ottens.  He played his first AFL game against Fremantle in round one of 2012 due to injuries to Nathan Vardy and Dawson Simpson. Stephenson was subsequently delisted by Geelong following the 2012 AFL Season. Stephenson was then drafted to the Richmond Tigers with pick no. 36 in the 2013 Rookie Draft. On 11 March 2014, Stephenson was elevated to the club's senior list.

Stephenson was delisted at the conclusion of the 2014 AFL season.

References

External links
 

Living people
1982 births
Redan Football Club players
North Ballarat Football Club players
Geelong Football Club players
Richmond Football Club players
Australian rules footballers from New South Wales